The August 5, 1961, race at Bridgehampton Raceway was the ninth racing event of the eleventh season of the Sports Car Club of America's 1961 Championship Racing Series.

A,B, & C Production Results

(Race Results)

References

External links
Etceterini.com
RacingSportsCars.com
World Sports Racing Prototypes
Dick Lang Racing History

Bridgehampton National Races